The 2000s is a documentary miniseries which premiered on July 8, 2018 on CNN. Produced by Tom Hanks and Gary Goetzman's studio Playtone, the 7-part series chronicles events and popular culture of the United States during the 2000s. It served as a follow-up to the predecessors The Sixties, The Seventies, The Eighties, and The Nineties. CNN greenlit the series in May 2016.

Episodes

References

External links

Official trailer

Television series set in the 2000s
2010s American documentary television series
2018 American television series debuts
2018 American television series endings
CNN original programming
Documentary television series about music
Documentary television series about war
Television series about the history of the United States
Television series by Playtone
2000 United States presidential election in popular culture
2004 United States presidential election in popular culture
2008 United States presidential election in popular culture